Alberta Provincial Highway No. 628, commonly referred to as Highway 628, is a highway in the province of Alberta, Canada that runs west to east through the Edmonton Capital Region in two sections. The western  section runs from the town of Stony Plain to the Edmonton city limits at 231 Street (Range Road 261). The eastern  section, also known as a Whitemud Extension, runs from Anthony Henday Drive to Highway 21 just south of Sherwood Park.

Whitemud Drive (79 Avenue west of Winterburn Road) connects both sections directly through Edmonton city limits, though it is not signed as Highway 628. It is also known as 79 Avenue in Stony Plain.

Major intersections 
From west to east:

References 

628
Roads in Strathcona County